Hy Hintermeister is a pseudonym for:
 John Henry Hintermeister (1869–1945), Swiss-born American artist, father of Henry
 Henry Hintermeister (1887–1970), American painter and illustrator, son of John Henry